Biswanath Das (born 3 October 1965) is an Indian politician who has been a Member of Legislative Assembly for Jaynagar since 2016. He is belonging to the All India Trinamool Congress.

Personal life
Biswanath Das was born on 3 October 1965, to a Bengali Hindu family in Jaynagar. He is a postgraduate of the University of Calcutta. He was a school teacher before entering politics.

Political career
In the 2016 Vidhan Sabha election, the All India Trinamool Congress nominated Biswanath Das from the Jaynagar Vidhan Sabha constituency. In this election, he defeated his nearest rival Sujit Patwari of the Indian National Congress by 15,051 votes.

References

Living people
1966 births
People from Jaynagar Majilpur
University of Calcutta alumni
21st-century Indian politicians
Anti-communism in India
Indian anti-communists
Bengali Hindus
Politicians from Kolkata
Trinamool Congress politicians from West Bengal
20th-century Indian politicians
Members of the West Bengal Legislative Assembly
West Bengal MLAs 2016–2021
West Bengal MLAs 2021–2026